The Crump Firm: Architects/ Planners/ Designers is an architectural firm based in Memphis, Tennessee. It is named for its founder Met Crump, a Fellow (FAIA) with the American Institute of Architects. The Crump Firm is now in its 47th year with 11 licensed architects, 13 interior designers and a total staff of 36 members. 
Their work includes:
Triad Centre III
Memphis University School Stadium
 FedEx World Headquarters building
Smith & Nephew Innovation Centre
International Place Tower III
Presbyterian Day School
Tennessee Air National Guard building 
 Wolf River Medical Arts Building
 Temple Israel (Memphis, Tennessee) expansion and renovation with Walt Reed of The Crump Firm in charge
 Lausanne Collegiate School
 St. Benedict at Auburndale High School
 Shelby County Jail Annex
 Tennessee Air National Guard
 Adams and Reese
 Cannon Wright Blount
 Davidson Hotel Company  
 Hunter Fan Corporate Headquarters
 Phi Mu Headquarters 
 Racquet Club of Memphis  
 Halloran Center

visit them at http://www.crumpfirm.com for more information.

References

Companies based in Memphis, Tennessee
Architecture firms based in Tennessee